Diacrisia irene is a moth of the family Erebidae. It was described by Arthur Gardiner Butler in 1881. It is found in the Russian Far East (Amur, Primorye, Sakhalin, Kunashir), eastern China, Korea and Japan.

References

Arctiina
Moths described in 1881
Moths of Japan